Supersonus is a genus of katydids in the order Orthoptera first described in 2014. The genus contains three species which are endemic to the rainforests of South America. Its name is an allusion to the fact that the males, in order to attract the females, produce a very high frequency noise which can reach 150 kHz (using only the right wing). This has been considered the highest frequency ultrasonic noise of the animal kingdom. The noise is imperceptible to human hearing, which is only capable of detecting up to 20 kHz.

Habitat
They live on and among the epiphytal growth such as bromeliads and orchids on tree trunks and limbs.

The Supersonus piercei population is known from Watershed Pericos around the small community of El Salto, in the Valle del Cauca Department of mainland Colombia. Like the rainforest of National Natural Park (PNN) Gorgona, the Watershed Pericos forest is a lowland tropical rainforest though is location on the western edges of the Andean Cordillera result in more rainfall and temperature fluctuation.

The population of Supersonus undulus inhabits a lowland rainforest environment at Tinalandia, in a private forest preserve between Quito and Santo Domingo de los Colorado in Pichincha Province.

Taxonomy 
Early specimens belonging to Supersonus were misidentified by researchers as specimens in the genus Arachnoscelis, with early specimen records dating back to 1927.  Redescription of the Arachnoscelis type species by Montealegre-Z et al. (2013) highlighted the notable differences between the type species and a number of specimens tentatively identified to that genus.

The genus Supersonus was first described by Sarria-S et al (2014) based on specimens collected from locations in Colombia and Ecuador.  Efforts to collect specimens were first collected during night expeditions in which researches manually searched the rainforest undergrowth wearing headlamps. However, over a span of almost 15 years, very few specimens were recovered.  Discovery of the adults' preferred living height allowed the entomologists to collect a much larger sample group. 
 
Sarria-S et al (2014) chose the genus name Supersonus as a combination of the Latin words "super" meaning "above" and "sonus" meaning "sound".  The name is recognition of the high forest perches used by calling males of the genus, along with the calls ranging above 100 kHz, and in honor of the original designation for ultrasonic frequencies as "supersonic".  Along with the genus description, three species were described in the 2014 type paper,  Supersonus aequoreus, Supersonus piercei, and Supersonus undulus.  
Initially the genus was placed into the Tettigoniidae subfamily Listroscelidinae and considered close in relationship to Arachnoscelis; however, further work led to a placement in the Meconematinae tribe Phisidini.

Acoustics
At the time of description, the communication calls of male Supersonus species were identified as the highest frequency known from an arthropod, with calls reaching 115 kHz, 125 kHz, and 150 kHz in the three species.  The typical frequency range for male katydid calls is between 5 kHz to 30 kHz, mostly within the human hearing range of 50 Hz to 20 kHz.  The mating call of male S. aequoreus  is the highest ultrasound calling carrier recorded in nature with a top frequency of 150 kHz.  The calls are generated by the modified right forewings which form a cavity over the insect dorsum producing sharp resonances and elevated sound pressure levels for the calling.

References 

Meconematinae
Tettigoniidae genera
Insects of South America